NGC 7319 is a highly distorted barred spiral galaxy that is a  member of the compact Stephan's Quintet group located in the constellation Pegasus, some  distant from the Milky Way. The galaxy's arms, dust and gas have been highly disturbed as a result of the interaction with the other members of the Quintet. Nearly all of the neutral hydrogen has been stripped from this galaxy, most likely as a result of a collision with NGC 7320c some 100 million years ago. A pair of long, parallel tidal tails extend southward from NGC 7319 in the direction of NGC 7320c, and is undergoing star formation.

This is a type 2 Seyfert galaxy with one of the largest circumnuclear outflows known in galaxies of this type. The star formation rate appears normal for a spiral galaxy at  yr−1, and the majority (68%) is occurring in the spiral arms. The core appears faint in the ultraviolet band, indicating heavy extinction within the active galactic nucleus. There is a three component radio source with an overall size of  that is straddling the nucleus. This quasi-stellar object is most likely being ejected from the host galaxy.

References

External links

Barred spiral galaxies
Seyfert galaxies
Interacting galaxies
Stephan's Quintet
Pegasus (constellation)
7319
69269
12102